The Philippine Star (self-styled The Philippine STAR) is an English-language newspaper in the Philippines and the flagship brand of the Philstar Media Group. First published on July 28, 1986, by veteran journalists Betty Go-Belmonte, Max Soliven and Art Borjal, it is one of several Philippine newspapers founded after the 1986 People Power Revolution.

Its sister publications include business newspaper BusinessWorld; Cebu-based, English-language broadsheet The Freeman; Filipino-language tabloids Pilipino Star Ngayon and Pang-Masa;  Cebuano-language tabloid Banat, online news portals Philstar.com,  PhilstarLife.com, Interaksyon (formerly with News5), LatestChika.com, Wheels.PH, PropertyReport.PH, Multiverse.PH and TV/digital production unit Philstar TV. 

In March 2014, the newspaper was acquired by MediaQuest Holdings, Inc., a media conglomerate subsidized by the PLDT Beneficial Trust Fund, after the company purchased a majority stake in Philstar Daily, Inc.

The Philippine Star is among the Philippines' most widely circulated newspapers, with an average circulation of 266,000 copies daily, according to the Philippine Yearbook 2013.

History

Founding
The Philippine Star was first published seven months after the 1986 People Power Revolution that toppled strongman Ferdinand Marcos and propelled Corazon Aquino to the Philippine presidency. Before its establishment, founders Betty Go-Belmonte, Max Soliven and Art Borjal were veteran journalists involved in the "Mosquito Press", a collective name for the different newspapers critical of the Marcos administration that were published after the Martial Law era from 1972 to 1981. At that time, Belmonte was the publisher of a small, monthly magazine called The Star, a predecessor of The Philippine Star.

On December 9, 1985, a few months before the 1986 People Power Revolution, Belmonte, Soliven, and Borjal, together with Eugenia Apostol, Louie Beltran, and Florangel Rosario-Braid, founded the English-language newspaper Philippine Daily Inquirer, which soon became the Marcos administration's most vocal critic. However, after the revolution, questions about finances and a divergence of priorities caused a rift among the Inquirer'''s founders, which led to Belmonte, Soliven, and Borjal's founding of The Philippine Star. Belmonte served as the founding chairman of the Board of Directors, while Soliven acted as the founding publisher and chairman of the editorial board. Antonio Roces served as the first editor-in-chief until his resignation in 1989.

Early years
The first issue of the newspaper on July 28, 1986, had eight pages, no advertisements and carried the headline, "Wear yellow and die" that featured the death of 23-year-old Stephen Salcedo, a bystander killed by a mob of Marcos loyalists during a rally at Manila's Luneta Park. The masthead of the newspaper carried the motto, "Truth Shall Prevail", reflecting its editorial policy of presenting both sides of the story instead of the prevailing "scoop mentality" of that time. Aside from the main news section, the first issue also includes the World, Nation, Money, Life and Sports sections.

The first issue of The Philippine Star was printed at Philstar Daily, Inc.'s printing press in Port Area, Manila and made use of a blue and yellow color scheme, which eventually became its signature colors. For its initial price of ₱1.75, the newspaper had an initial print run of “a few thousand copies”.

At first, the newspaper was only published from Mondays to Saturdays because Belmonte prohibited work on Sundays. To capitalize on Sunday readership, Philstar Daily, Inc. began publishing Starweek on February 15, 1987, which served as the Sunday magazine of The Philippine Star. Eventually, in 1988, the newspaper added a Sunday issue in response to the demand for news on that day, while continuing its publication of Starweek. Aside from The Philippine Star, Philstar Daily, Inc. also started publishing a Filipino-language tabloid Ang Pilipino Ngayon, which eventually became Pilipino Star Ngayon.

Soliven era
With the sudden death of Belmonte due to cancer on January 28, 1994, Soliven assumed chairmanship of the Board of Directors while retaining his position as publisher. He appointed Belmonte's 30-year-old son, Miguel Belmonte, as executive vice president. In the same year, the newspaper made use of the slogan "The only paper you read from cover to cover", in keeping with the new editorial policy of improving every single section of the paper so each can stand on its own even without the main news section. On August 4, 1995, The Philippine Star became the first Philippine broadsheet newspaper to publish a colored front page.

Miguel Belmonte era
In 1998, the Board of Directors unanimously appointed Miguel Belmonte as president and CEO, while Soliven remained as chairman of the board of directors and publisher. The following year, the newspaper introduced “Hotline 2000”, which made use of SMS as a means for opinion polling, thus becoming a pioneer in televoting in the Philippine print media industry. It was the beginning of other digital endeavors that brought the newspaper to the Digital Age. In 2000, the newspaper debuted its website, philstar.com, thus becoming one of the first newspapers in the Philippines to have a presence in the Internet. In the same year, the company began using computer-to-plate printing system. In that year too, Miguel's brother, Isaac Belmonte, was appointed editor-in-chief of the newspaper.

To further expand its readership, The Philippine Star entered into a partnership with fast food restaurant Jollibee in 2003 to become the first newspaper to be distributed free of charge in a fast food restaurant. A complimentary copy of the newspaper was given to Jollibee patrons nationwide for every purchase of a Jollibee breakfast meal.

On August 24, 2004, The Philippine Star acquired Cebu City-based English-language newspaper The Freeman and its sister publication, the Cebuano-language tabloid Banat as part of its strategy to strengthen its presence and influence in the Visayas-Mindanao region. The Freeman is the longest-running broadsheet newspaper in Cebu City, established on May 10, 1919, while Banat was first published on August 23, 1994. Both newspapers are owned by the influential Gullas political family.

The newspaper lost its founding publisher after Soliven died in Tokyo, Japan on November 24, 2006. Isaac Belmonte eventually replaced him as publisher and chairman of the editorial board in 2012. Former executive editor Ana Marie "Amy" Pamintuan serves as current editor-in-chief after replacing Isaac Belmonte in 2012.

Acquisition by MediaQuest Holdings
As early 2009, businessman and PLDT chairman Manuel V. Pangilinan had expressed his interest in acquiring a stake in The Philippine Star in a bid to dominate the multimedia industry. The following year, Pangilinan's MediaQuest Holdings, Inc., the media conglomerate of PLDT, acquired a 20-percent stake in the newspaper, as well as an 18-percent stake in its rival Philippine Daily Inquirer. In 2014, MediaQuest finally took control of The Philippine Star after it acquired a majority stake of 51 percent in the newspaper. The Belmonte family retained a 21-percent stake, as well as management and editorial control. MediaQuest chairman Pangilinan has since appointed lawyer Ray Espinosa as chairman of the newspaper's board of directors.
 The Philippine Star acquired the 76.67-percent stake of Hastings Holdings, Inc. in its sister broadsheet BusinessWorld in 2015. The transaction was done to enhance to its market leadership and to strengthen BusinessWorld's position in the newspaper business.

Notable columnists
Opinion

Entertainment
 Boy Abunda, television host, publicist, talent manager and celebrity endorser. 
 Joey de Leon, comedian, actor, recording artist and TV presenter. He hosts the noontime variety show Eat Bulaga!.
 Pepe Diokno, motion picture director, producer and screenwriter.

Lifestyle
 Tim Yap, TV and radio host, newspaper editor, creative director, columnist, club owner and eventologist.
 Cheryl Tiu, lifestyle columnist and editor-at-large of Lifestyle Asia magazine.
 Lucy Torres, actress, model, television host and congressional representative of the 4th District of Leyte.
 Bianca Gonzalez, lifestyle columnist, TV host and model.

Sports
 Quinito Henson, sports analyst and TV sports commentator.

Others
See also

 Manila Bulletin Philippine Daily Inquirer The Manila Times''

References

External links
Media Ownership Monitor Philippines – Media Companies: A Duopoly rules by VERA Files and Reporters Without Borders
Media Ownership Monitor Philippines – Print by VERA Files and Reporters Without Borders

 
National newspapers published in the Philippines
Newspapers published in Metro Manila
Publications established in 1986
Companies based in Manila